A Cozy Cottage is a 1963 Hungarian drama film directed by Tamás Fejér. It was entered into the 1963 Cannes Film Festival.

Cast
 Margit Bara as Panni - Máté felesége
 Miklós Gábor as Palotás
 György Pálos as Máté József
 Éva Schubert as Máthé titkárnõje
 Zoltán Latinovits as János
 Mária Medgyesi as Szekeresné
 Nóra Tábori as Palotásné
 Nándor Tomanek as Szekeres Péter

References

External links

1963 films
1960s Hungarian-language films
Hungarian black-and-white films
1963 drama films
Films directed by Tamás Fejér
Hungarian drama films